Palestine–Peru relations are bilateral relations between the State of Palestine and Peru. Peru recognized Palestine as a sovereign state on 24 January 2011. Both nations are members of the Non-Aligned Movement. Palestine has an embassy in Lima.

In 2014, President of Peru Ollanta Humala visited Palestine, met with President of Palestine Mahmoud Abbas and laid a wreath at Yasser Arafat's tomb.

See also
 Foreign relations of Peru
 Foreign relations of Palestine

References 

Peru
Palestine
State of Palestine–Peru relations